Jacob Emden, also known as Ya'avetz (June 4, 1697 April 19, 1776), was a leading German rabbi and talmudist who championed Orthodox Judaism in the face of the growing influence of the Sabbatean movement. He was acclaimed in all circles for his extensive knowledge.

Emden was the son of the hakham Tzvi Ashkenazi, and a descendant of Elijah Ba'al Shem of Chełm. He lived most his life in Altona (now a part of Hamburg, Germany), where he held no official rabbinic position and earned a living by printing books. His son was Meshullam Solomon, rabbi of the Hambro Synagogue in London who claimed authority as Chief Rabbi of the United Kingdom from 1765 to 1780.

The acronym Ya'avetz (also written Yaavetz) stands for the words Yaakov (Emden) ben Tzvi (his father's name) (Hebrew: יעקב (עמדין) בן צבי - יעב"ץ).

Seven of his 31 works were published posthumously.

Biography 
Jacob Emden (born Ashkenazi) was the 5th of his father's 15 children.

Until the age of seventeen, Emden studied Talmud under his father Tzvi Ashkenazi, a foremost rabbinic authority, first at Altona, then at Amsterdam (1710–1714). In 1715 Emden married Rachel, daughter of Mordecai ben Naphtali Kohen, rabbi of Ungarisch-Brod, Moravia (the modern Czech Republic), and continued his studies in his father-in-law's yeshivah. Emden became well versed in all branches of Talmudic literature; later he studied philosophy, kabbalah, and grammar, and made an effort to acquire the Latin and Dutch languages, in which, however, he was seriously hindered by his belief that a Jew should occupy himself with secular sciences only during times it was impossible to study Torah.

Career
Emden spent three years at Ungarisch-Brod, where he held the office of private lecturer in Talmud. Later he became a dealer in jewelry and other articles, an occupation which compelled him to travel. He generally declined to accept the office of rabbi, though in 1728 he was induced to accept the rabbinate of Emden, from which place he took his name.

He returned to Altona in, where he obtained permission from the Jewish community to possess a private synagogue. Emden was at first on friendly terms with Moses Hagis, the head of the Portuguese-Jewish community at Altona, who was afterward turned against Emden by some calumny. His relations with Ezekiel Katzenellenbogen, the chief rabbi of the German community, were positive at first, but deteriorated swiftly.

A few years later Emden obtained from the King of Denmark the privilege of establishing at Altona a printing-press. He was soon attacked for his publication of the siddur (prayer book) Ammudei Shamayim, due to his harsh criticisms of the powerful local money changers. His opponents did not cease denouncing him even after he had obtained for his work the approbation of the chief rabbi of the German communities.

According to Jacob Katz, "Rabbi Jacob Emden: Life and Major Works" (Jacob J. Schacter, unpublished PhD dissertation, Harvard University, 1988),  "supplanted" Mortimer J. Cohen's 1937 book Jacob Emden: A Man of Controversy,  as the most authoritative source on Emden.

Ya'a'vetz pen name
In the preface to his She'I'Las Yaavetz, Emden describes how, as a child, he asked his father, the Chacham Tzvi, why he signed his name as simply Tzvi  צבי, without his father's name (בן יעקב). The father said that Tzvi stands for Tzvi ben Yaakov צבי בן יעקב, and that when the son grows up, and writes books, he should sign Ya'avetz  יעב"ץ . The Yud Ayyin combination of Yaavetz would stand for Yaakov (rather than Yosef, or Yehuda), and the remaining two letters representing ben Tzvi : קב ן בי.

Sabbatean controversy

Emden accused Jonathan Eybeschütz of being a secret Sabbatean. The controversy lasted several years, continuing even after Eybeschütz's death. Emden's assertion of Eybeschütz's heresy was chiefly based on the interpretation of some amulets prepared by Eybeschütz, in which Emden saw Sabbatean allusions.   Hostilities began before Eybeschütz left Prague, and in 1751, when Eybeschütz was named chief rabbi of the three communities of Altona, Hamburg, and Wandsbek, the controversy reached the stage of intense and bitter antagonism. Emden maintained that he was at first prevented by threats from publishing anything against Eybeschütz. He solemnly declared in his synagogue the writer of the amulets to be a Sabbatean heretic and deserving of excommunication. In ''Megillat Sefer'', he even accuses Eybeschütz of having an incestuous relationship with his own daughter, and of fathering a child with her. However, there have been allegations that ''Megillat Sefer'' was tampered with, and had deliberately ridiculous accusations, as well as outlandish tales, written in to the original in order to make a mockery of Emden.

Clashes between opposing supporters occurred in the streets drawing the attention of the secular authorities. The majority of the community, including R. Aryeh Leib Halevi-Epstein of Konigsberg, favored Eybeschütz; thus the council condemned Emden as a slanderer. People were ordered, under pain of excommunication, not to attend Emden's synagogue, and he himself was forbidden to issue anything from his press. As Emden still continued his philippics against Eybeschütz, he was ordered by the council of the three communities to leave Altona. This he refused to do, relying on the strength of the king's charter, and he was, as he maintained, relentlessly persecuted. His life seeming to be in actual danger, in May 1751 he left the town and took refuge in Amsterdam, where he had many friends and where he joined the household of his brother-in-law, Aryeh Leib ben Saul, rabbi of the Ashkenazic community.

The controversy was heard by both the Senate of Hamburg and by the Royal Court of Denmark. The Hamburg Senate quickly found in favour of Eybeschütz. King Frederick V of Denmark asked Eybeschütz to answer a number of questions about the amulets. Conflicting testimony was put forward and the matter remained officially unresolved although the court sentenced the council of the three communities  to pay a fine of one hundred thaler for civil unrest and ordered that Emden be allowed to return to Altona.

Emden then returned to Altona and took possession of his synagogue and printing-establishment, though he was forbidden to continue his agitation against Eybeschütz. The latter's partisans, however, did not desist from their warfare against Emden. They accused him before the authorities of continuing to publish denunciations against his opponent. One Friday evening (July 8, 1755) his house was broken into and his papers seized and turned over to the "Ober-Präsident" (royally imposed mayor), . Six months later von Qualen appointed a commission of three scholars, who, after a close examination, found nothing which could incriminate Emden. Eyebeschutz was re-elected as Chief Rabbi. In December of that year, the Hamburg Senate rejected both the King's decision and the election result. The Senate of Hamburg started an intricate process to determine the powers of Eybeschütz, as Chief Rabbi

The truth or falsity of his denunciations against Eybeschütz cannot be proved; Gershom Scholem wrote much on this subject, and his student Perlmutter devoted a book to proving it. According to historian David Sorkin, Eybeschütz was probably a Sabbatean, and Eybeschütz's son openly declared himself to be a Sabbatean after his father's death. There is further background which suggests that Eybeschutz may have been a Sabbatean.  In July 1725, the Ashkenazic beit din of Amsterdam issued a ban of excommunication on the entire Sabbatean sect (kat ha-ma’aminim) based partially on the discovery of certain Sabbatean writings by it. Rabbi Ezekiel Katzenellenbogen, the chief rabbi of the Three Communities  was unwilling to attack Eybeschütz publicly, but stated that one of the Sabbatean texts found by the Amsterdam beit din "Va-Avo ha-Yom el ha-Ayyin”  was authored by  Eybeschütz and declared that the all copies of the work that were in circulation should be immediately burned. The recent discovery in Metz of notarial copies of the disputed amulets written by Eyebeschutz support Emden's view that these are Sabbatean writings.

Other notable events

In 1756 the members of the Synod of Constantinov applied to Emden to aid in repressing the Sabbatean movement. As the Sabbateans referred much to the Zohar, Emden thought it wise to examine that book, and after a careful study he concluded that a great part of the Zohar was the production of an impostor.

Emden's works show him to have been possessed of critical powers rarely found among his contemporaries. He was strictly Orthodox, never deviating the least from tradition, even when the difference in time and circumstance might have warranted a deviation from custom. Emden's opinions were often viewed as extremely unconventional from the perspective of strictly traditional mainstream Judaism, though not so unusual in more free-thinking Enlightenment circles. Emden had friendly relations with Moses Mendelssohn, founder of the Haskalah movement, and with a number of Christian scholars.

In 1772 Frederick II, Duke of Mecklenburg-Schwerin, having issued a decree forbidding burial on the day of death, the Jews in his territories approached Emden with the request that he demonstrate from the Talmud that a longer exposure of a corpse would be against the Law. Emden referred them to Mendelssohn, who had great influence with Christian authorities and wrote in excellent German. Mendelssohn wrote the requested letter to the Duke, but privately complained to Emden that based on the Talmud, it seemed the Duke was correct. Emden wrote to him in strong terms, saying that it was ludicrous to assert that the custom of the entire Jewish people was blatantly incorrect, and told Mendelssohn that this kind of claim would only strengthen rumors of irreligiousness he (Mendelssohn) had aroused by his associations.

Views
Emden was a traditionalist who responded to the ideals of tolerance being circulated during the 18th-century Enlightenment. He stretched the traditional inclusivist position into universal directions.
Like Maimonides, he believed that monotheistic faiths have an important roles to play in God's plan for mankind, writing that "we should consider Christians and Muslims as instruments for the fulfilment of the prophecy that the knowledge of God will one day spread throughout the earth." Emden praised the ethical teachings of Christianity, considering them beneficial in removing the prevalence of idolatry and bestowing gentiles with a "moral doctrine". Emden also suggested that ascetic Christian practices provided additional rectification of the soul in the same way that Judaic commandments do.

He theoretically advocated the taking of a concubine by a scholar since the sages of the Talmud stated "the greater the man, the greater his evil inclination" and cited many sources in support. He also suggested it might be permissible under certain circumstances for a Jewish man to cohabit with a single Jewish woman, provided that she is in an exclusive relationship with him that is public knowledge and where she would not be embarrassed to ritually immerse. He also wished to revoke the ban on polygamy instituted by Rabbeinu Gershom believing it erroneously followed Christian morals, although he admitted he lacked the power to do so.

Emden wrote that he owned books containing secular wisdom written in Hebrew, but that he would read them in the bathroom. He was opposed to philosophy and maintained that the views contained in The Guide for the Perplexed could not have been authored by Maimonides, but rather by an unknown heretic.

Published works

Edut BeYaakov, on the alleged heresy of Eybeschütz, and including Iggeret Shum, a letter to the rabbis of the "Four Lands." Altona, 1756.
Shimmush, comprising three smaller works: Shoṭ la-Sus and Meteg laHamor, on the growing influence of the Sabbateans, and Sheveṭ leGev Kesilim, a refutation of heretical demonstrations. Amsterdam, 1758–62.
Shevirat Luchot haAven, a refutation of Eybeschütz's "Luchot Edut." Altona, 1759.
Sechok haKesil, Yekev Ze'ev, and Gat Derukhah, three polemical works published in the Hit'abbekut of one of his pupils. Altona, 1762.
Mitpachat Sefarim, in two parts: the first part showing that part of the Zohar is not authentic but a later compilation; the second, a criticism on "Emunat Hakhamim" and "Mishnat Hakhamim," and other seforim and polemical letters addressed to the rabbi of Königsberg. Altona, 1761–68.
Herev Pifiyyot, Iggeret Purim, Teshuvot haMinim, and Zikkaron beSefer, on money-changers and bankers (unpublished).
Lechem Shamayim, a commentary on the Mishnah, with a treatise in two parts, on Maimonides' Mishneh Torah, Beit haBechirah. Altona, 1728; Wandsbeck, 1733.
Iggeret Bikkoret, responsa. Altona, 1733.
She'elat Ya'abetz, a collection of 372 responsa. Altona, 1739–59.
Siddur Tefillah, an edition of the ritual with a commentary, grammatical notes, ritual laws, and various treatises, in three parts: Beit-El, Sha'ar haShamayim, and Migdal Oz. It also includes a treatise entitled Even Bochan, and a criticism on Menahem Lonzano's Avodat Mikdash, entitled Seder Avodah. Altona, 1745–48.
Etz Avot, a commentary to Pirkei Avot, with Lechem Nekudim, grammatical notes. Amsterdam, 1751.
Sha'agat Aryeh, a eulogy for his brother-in-law Aryeh Leib ben Saul, the rabbi of Amsterdam. Amsterdam, 1755. This was also included in his Kishurim leYa'akov.
Seder Olam Rabbah veZutta, the two Seder Olam and Megillat Ta'anit, edited with critical notes. Hamburg, 1757.
Mor uKetziah, novellæ on Orach Hayyim (the novellæ on Yoreh Deah, Even haEzer, and Hoshen Mishpat of Mor uKetziah were unpublished)
Tzitzim uFerachim, a collection of kabbalistic articles arranged in alphabetical order. Altona, 1768.
Luach Eresh, grammatical notes on the prayers, and a criticism of Solomon Hena's Sha'arei Tefillah. Altona, 1769.
Shemesh Tzedakah. Altona, 1772.
Pesach Gadol, Tefillat Yesharim, and Ḥoli Ketem. Altona, 1775.
Sha'arei Azarah. Altona, 1776.
Divrei Emet uMishpaṭ Shalom (n. d. and n. p.).
Megillat Sefer, containing biographies of himself and of his father. Warsaw 1897
Kishurim leYaakov, collection of sermons.
Marginal novellæ on the Babylonian Talmud.
Emet LeYaakov, notes on Zohar and assorted works, including Dei Rossis' Meor Einayim. Kiryas Joel, 2017

His unpublished rabbinical writings are the following:
Tza'akat Damim, refutation of the blood accusation in Poland.
Halakah Pesuḳah.
Hilkheta liMeshicha, responsum to R. Israel Lipschütz.
Mada'ah Rabbah.
Gal-Ed, commentary to Rashi and to the Targum of the Pentateuch.
Em laBinah, commentary to the whole Bible.
Em laMikra velaMasoret, also a commentary to the Bible.

Emden Siddur
20th century printings (Lemberg 1904, Augsburg 1948) with a cover title "Siddur Beis Yaakov" (also Anglicized as Siddur Bet Yaakov) (Hebrew סידור בית יעקב) exist. Their cover(s) say Jacob from Emden יעקב מעמדין.

The 472 page Lemberg 1904 printing has Tikun Leil Shavuot on pages 275-305.  This siddur is much larger than the author's Shaarei ShaMaYim siddur.

Shaarei ShaMaYim 
A physically smaller siddur, reprinted in Israel 1994, was titled Siddur Rebbe Yaakov of Emden
(Hebrew: סידור רבי יעקב מעמדין) on the upper half of the cover, and Siddur HaYaavetz Shaarei ShaMaYim (סדור היעבייץ שערי שמים) The content/commentary is not as detailed/extensive as the full Emden siddur (for example, it is missing Tikkun Leil Shavuot). It is a 2-volume set (the first 2 books on the left side/see photo).

References

External links
Emden, Jacob Israel Ben Zebi Ashkenazi, jewishencyclopedia.com
Jacob Emden, jewishvirtuallibrary.org
Rabbi Jacob Emden's View on Christianity and the Noachite Commandments, Reprinted from the Journal of Ecumenical Studies, 19:1, Winter 1982
, from Shelyot Ye'avetz, v 2, 15
.
Cohen, Mortimer Joseph, Jacob Emden, A Man of Controversy, Philadelphia, Dropsie College for Hebrew and Cognate Learning, 1937.
Schacter, Jacob J., Rabbi Jacob Emden: Life and Major Works, Diss., Department of Near Eastern Languages and Civilizations, Harvard University, Cambridge, Massachusetts 1988.

1697 births
1776 deaths
People from Altona, Hamburg
18th-century German rabbis
German Orthodox rabbis
Kabbalists
Dutch Orthodox rabbis
Rabbis from Hamburg
Exponents of Jewish law